The Ministry of Foreign Trade also known as Mincomex, was a national executive ministry of the Government of Colombia in charge of foreign trade issues in order to improve the Economy of Colombia. It was merged with the Ministry of Economic Development to form the Ministry of Commerce, Industry and Tourism.

Ministers

Foreign Relations of Colombia
Colombia seeks diplomatic and commercial relations with all countries, regardless of their ideologies or political or economic systems. For this reason, the Colombian economy is very open, relying on international trade and following the guidelines given by the international law.

Regional relations remain good despite occasional issues with neighbors, especially regarding spillover from Colombia's armed conflict, including cross-border guerrilla crossings, the flow of refugees, and the spread of drug crops. These issues are of particular concern to the bordering countries of Brazil, Ecuador, Panama, Peru, and Venezuela. For example, Ecuador has closed its main border crossing with Colombia every night since August 2002, when evidence emerged that Colombian guerrillas and paramilitaries were asserting control over Ecuador's border communities. On May 1, 2004, Ecuador placed further stringent visa restrictions on Colombians seeking to enter Ecuador. Relations with Nicaragua and Venezuela have been strained over territorial disputes. Bilateral committees are negotiating the dispute with Venezuela over waters in the Gulf of Venezuela. Other issues with Venezuela include the presence of illegal undocumented Colombians in Venezuela, and activities of Colombian narcotics traffickers, and Venezuela's support for the Guerrillas in Colombia.

References

Ministries established in 1991
Ministry of Commerce, Industry and Tourism (Colombia)
Government agencies disestablished in 2002
Defunct government agencies of Colombia
1991 establishments in Colombia
Foreign trade of Colombia